Gudrun Baudisch, later Gudrun Baudisch-Wittke (born 17 March 1907 – 16 October 1982) was an Austrian woman ceramist, sculptor and painter. Baudisch founded the Keramik Hallstatt workshop.

Education 
Baudisch was born in Pöls near Judenburg. Her Father, the doctor Raimund Baudisch (1876–1936), and her stepmother Rudolfine Cervonik (1884–1953) were very interested in art and culture. Therefore, they encouraged their daughter's desire for an artistic profession to the best of their abilities. In 1922 Baudisch was admitted to the Österreichische Bundeslehranstalt für das Baufach und Kunstgewerbe in Graz and worked for a year in the sculpture class of Wilhelm Gösser. The "heads" created in 1924, which are characteristic of Baudisch, were probably inspired by colleagues (Vally Wieselthier, Rudolf Knörlein) at the Scheibbs factory. From 1923 onwards, she followed a three-year apprenticeship in the ceramics class of Hans Adametz, and in 1926 she received her diploma from the Graz institute.

Early work 
In 1926 she began her professional activity as a volunteer in the design department of the Wiener Werkstätte. By the end of the year, she had created her first models for serial ceramics. Baudisch designed and executed 166 objects for the Wiener Werkstätte. Well-known is the "Woman's Head with Bowl" from 1926, which was to find many sequels. In 1928, together with Vally Wieselthier, she designed the cover of the celebratory catalogue for the 25th anniversary of the Wiener Werkstätte. From 1926 to 1930 she worked there as a designer and exerted great influence with her almost expressive ornamentation, playful heads and the best craftsmanship. However, financial hardship and the coming world economic crisis prevented an upswing in the ceramics department.

In 1930 she was able to take part in the  exhibition in Vienna with two life-size sculptures. In the same year she left the Wiener Werkstätte at her own request and founded her own ceramics workshop with Mario von Pontoni. This existed from 1930 to 1936.

In 1931 she married the engineer Leopold Teltscher.

So-called architectural works and stucco decorations in public buildings and in several churches began. As an assistant to the architect Clemens Holzmeister, she took over the architectural work on Kemal Atatürk's presidential palace in Ankara. Her work includes the decoration of the colonnaded courtyard on the ground floor of the palace with five fully sculptured female figures made of terracotta, whose design can be traced back to the influence of Josef Thorak and Anton Hanak. Clemens Holzmeister then went to Turkey and Greece for professional reasons, so that it was not until 1956 that he and Baudisch worked together again.

For the "General German Catholic Day" in Vienna in 1933, Baudisch made various Christian emblems, two processional flags, a church bell and a baptismal font. In 1935, she designed the new Austrian 1-schilling coin. In 1934 she received the 1st prize of the Austrian Ministry of Finance for both the 50 groschen and the 1 schilling design. She also worked on the Austrian pavilion for the Brussels International Exposition (1935). In the same year she became a full member of the Artists' Association of Austrian Sculptors.
She divorced Leopold Teltscher in 1936.

Activity in Germany during the Nazi era 
In 1936, Baudisch moved to Berlin. The name of Josef Thorak, who had already established himself as an artist in the Third Reich and whom Baudisch had already met in Ankara, reappeared. In Germany, the "Kunst-am-Bau-Verordnung" (Art in Construction Ordinance) had provided good working conditions for artists since 1934, even if the so-called "renewal of art" sought by the National Socialist regime was not to everyone's liking.

In the course of her work for the Nazi regime, she met the officer Karl Heinz Wittke (1908–1978) in 1938. He supervised the artist in her work at the Hermann Goering Barracks. Her second marriage to him followed on 17 December 1940. Her husband later turned out to be a competent businessman who also enabled her to pursue a largely unrestricted artistic career. From the first larger fee, Baudisch acquired a house in Hallstatt, (Hallstatt No. 16, "Zoblisches Wohnhaus") in 1937, which had to be sold by the Jewish family of Alfred Eichmanns in the course of aryanisation.

Baudisch carried out building decoration work (stucco ceilings and walls, fireplace design) in the Hakenburg castle, which was used as a private residence by Reichspostminister Ohnesorge. She also furnished the Italian Consulate General and the Spanish Embassy on behalf of the Reichsbaudirektion. However, her work was not limited to Berlin; she also received commissions for Schwerin, Posen, Hamburg and Nuremberg, and the so-called Tannenberg Memorial in East Prussia was furnished by her with a terracotta wall bearing emblems of the Luftwaffe.

Activity in Austria in the post-war period 
In 1944, Baudisch moved with her husband to Hallstatt. In 1945/46 Baudisch founded the Keramik Hallstatt workshop, initially also called "Hallstatt-Keramik" or "Hallstätter Keramik", which she also ran until 1977 (handover to Erwin Gschwandtner, now owned by his sons). Originals and series were created in their art pottery. On 30 June 1947 she passed the master's examination for the pottery trade; she had already received her trade licence for the pottery trade before that, namely on 30 April 1947. The works are more geared towards commercial (utility ceramics, tiled stoves) rather than artistic success of the products. One exception is a famous mocha service, whose Scandinavian-looking design Baudisch developed together with the Russian-born architect  (1906–2004) had developed.

They were also able to get Wolfgang von Wersin, who lived in neighbouring Bad Goisern, to develop tableware. In 1952, they both joined the Künstlergruppe MAERZ; both were advocates of the Werkbund idea and when Wersin stood down at the general assembly of the Upper Austrian Werkbund, she was elected his successor.

The stucco ceiling for the health resort in Bad Gastein was created as a larger work in 1948. A stucco ceiling planned between 1951 and 1954 for the destroyed Gold Cabinet in Belvedere Palace was not executed. In 1954, she received a commission for the stucco decoration of the ceiling in the auditorium of the Vienna Burgtheater; for health reasons, however, she had to hand over the commission to Hilda Schmid-Jesser.

From 1959 to 1966, she created, again in collaboration with Clemens Holzmeister, the ceramic room decoration of the Großes Festspielhaus in Salzburg. In 1980 she created the sculpture "Porcelain Tree" for the ORF studio in Salzburg. She had already varied the tree motif in other works (for example Lebensbaum at the Holzleiten estate in Rüstdorf).

In 1968, together with Johannes Hohenberg, who had taken over Gmundner Keramik in 1968, she founded the "Gruppe H" (H stands for Hallstatt and Hohenberg) work group. In 1969, the sales premises of "Gruppe H" were founded in Salzburg (in a through house at Universitätsplatz 6). The company sign can still be found on the house for nostalgic reasons, although the business had already ceased in 1982.

In 1974, she moved to Salzburg. Here she lived with her husband in a small flat in the old town on Universitätsplatz until her death; in addition, she had set up a studio in the district of Riedenburg, where she could continue to pursue her clay work.

Works 
Source:

Coins
 1934/35 Value side of the 50-groschen and 1-schilling coin

Ceramic building works

 Bad Goisern
 spa hotel, 1951/52.
 Volksbank: Baukeramik, 1973.
 Electrode factory Steeg: wall decoration on the office building, 1962.
 Bad Ischl
 central school: entrance design, 1962.
 Hotel Goldener Stern, 1962/72.
 Upper Austria People's Credit Bank: Relief, 1962.
 Kurhaus, 1966.
 Kurmittelhaus, 1967.
 Bad Schallerbach, bath house, 1975.
 Gloggnitz, Christ the King's Church: Marien-Kap., 1965.
 Grein, nursing home: Institution-Kap .; Tabernacle, 1973.
 Hallstatt
 Hotel Grüner Baum: Mosaik et al., 1952, 1977.
 Music rehearsal room in Lahn: wall decoration, 1958.
 Elementary school, 1965.
 Leogang, Hotel Krallerhof: wall decoration of the cellar bar, 1973.
 Linz
 Urban retirement home: mosaic, 1962.
 Bruckner Conservatory: Frieze in the Great Hall, 1970.
 Chamber of Agriculture: Lecture Hall, 1973/74. State Theater, 1957 (also stucco work).
 Landeskulturzentrum Ursulinenhof: ballroom wall design, 1975/76.
 Restaurant, 1978.
 Mayrhofen / Tyrol, Catholic parish: Tabernacle cladding; Baptism chap., 1968/69.
 Obertraun
 Berghotel Krippenstein, 1950/56.
 Federal Sports School, 1951–53 (also stucco ceiling and stove).
 Rechnitz / Burgenland, sisters from Göttl. Redeemer: tabernacle, cape altar cross, 1975.
 Rustorf / Upper Austria, elementary school: facade mosaic, 1971.
 Salzburg
 Festspielhaus, 1959/60 (also mortar-cut ceiling in the presidential room).
 Hotel Gablerbräu, 1953 (together with Carl Jamöck); 12 medallions.
 Hotel Austria Hof, 1961/62.
 Strobl / Salzburg, Volksbildungsheim: Mosaik, 1969.
 Weyregg, Housekeeping School, 1976.
 Vienna
 Wiener Ver., Administration building (Vienna III): Mosaik, 1963.
 Central cemetery, crematorium: various mosaics, 1967/69, 1970/72, 1976/77.
 Cemetery SW (Vienna XII): Relief, 1974/75.
 Economic Development Inst. (Vienna XVIII): Wall sculpture, purchased in 1972.
 Wörgl / Tirol, Urn Cemetery: Plastic, 1965.
 Zell Am See, gliding school, Fliegerheim: mural, 1958.
 Zwölfaxing / Lower Austria, Catholic Parish: Tabernakel, 1966/67.

Stucco

 Ankara, Gazi Ewi, Palace Kemal Atatürk, 1930.
 Badgastein, Kurheim, 1948.
 Bad Goisern, spa hotel, 1951/52.
 Berlin (together with C. Jamöck)
 K.-Schumacher-Damm, Quartier Napoleon: ballroom ceiling; Terracotta fireplace, 1937/38.
 Italian Consulate (Graf-Spee-Str. 17), 1938/41.
 Spanish Consulate (Lichtensteinallee 30): Ballroom ceiling, 1938/43.
 Reichsmünze (Moltke market): 1936/42.
 Bregenz, Mariahilf Church: ceiling also stone and ceramic work; Virgin Mary statue above the high altar, 1931.
 Frohnleiten / Styria, Pfannberg Castle, 1959/60.
 Fuschl / Salzburg, Hotel Schloss Fuschl, 1959.
 Gmunden, Stadttheater: Saaldecke, 1949 (together with C. Jamöck).
 Rustorf / Upper Austria, Gut Holzleithen, 1952
 Salzburg, Chamber for Workers and Employees: Blanket, 1950 (together with C. Jamöck).
 Vienna
 Konfektionshaus Neumann (Vienna I): ceiling in the ladies' salon, 1949/50 (together with C. Jamöck).
 Villa Mautner-Markhof (Vienna XI): ceiling in the music room, 1949 (together with C. Jamöck).
 Vienna (XV), Christ the King Memorial Church, 1934 (together with C. Jamöck).

Other architecture and monument art

 Altenmarkt / Pongau: tabernacle. Brussels, World Exhibition, Austria Pavilion: Tree of Life, mortar cut, 1935.
 Hallstatt
 Urnenhain: Monument, 1962 (design E. Boltenstern).
 Road tunnel, S-portal: state coat of arms, bronze relief, 1966.
 Salzberg burial ground: fountain, 1956 (design C. Holzmeister).
 Leoben, Creditanstalt, Kassenhalle: plaster mortar cut, 1951/52.
 Linz
 Schlosszwinger playground: drinking fountain with mosaic, 1956/57.
 Südbahnhof: Fischbrunnen, 1952.
 Dr. E. Koref School: Fischbrunnen, 1959.
 Mauthausen, Bezirksaltenheim: interior design of the chapel, 1964.
 Riyadh / Saudi Arabia, Council of Ministers Majlis Al Shura: wall decoration, furnishings, design, 1975.

Awards 
 1934: 1st prize in the coin competition of the Austrian Ministry of Finance for the 50-groschen and 1-schilling design
 1961: Berufstitel Professor (title of professor)
 1962: Bayerischer Staatspreis der Handwerkskammer München
 1964: Silver medal at the international ceramics exhibition in Prague
 1965: XXIII. Concorso internationale della Ceramica d’Arte contemporanea, Gold medal, Faenza, Italy
 1971: Honorary citizen of Hallstatt

References

Further reading 
 Otto Wutzel (ed.): Gudrun Baudisch : Keramik, von der Wiener Werkstätte zur Keramik Hallstatt. OLV-Buchverlag, Linz 1980,  (with catalogue raisonné).
 Tina Sitter: Gudrun Baudisch und ihre Zeit in der Wiener Werkstätte (1926–1930), Einflüsse – Parallelen – eigene Formensprache. Universität, Wien 2005. (Diplom-Arbeit).
 Ruth Kaltenegger: Katalog zur Ausstellung Gudrun Baudisch zum 100. Geburtstag. Museumsverein Zinkenbacher Malerkolonie (Schriften des Museums Zinkenbacher Malerkolonie III, Monographien 2), 2007, .
 Urd Vaelske: Gudrun Baudisch – Kaffee- und Teeservice, Kunstwerk des Monats, Salzburg Museum, September 2015, 28. Jahrgang, Blatt 329

External links 

 Landeskorrespondenz – Keramiken von Gudrun Baudisch in St. Gilgen ausgestellt
 Keramik Hallstatt Gschwandtner OEG
 

Austrian ceramists
Austrian women artists
1907 births
1982 deaths
People from Murtal District